Kaznějov is a town in Plzeň-North District in the Plzeň Region of the Czech Republic. It has about 3,000 inhabitants.

Geography
The Kaznějovský Brook flows through the town.

History
The first written mention of Kaznějov is from 1145, after the monastery in Plasy was founded. The village served as the economic background of the monastery.

In 1997, Kaznějov became a town.

Economy
In the woods of Kaznějov there is the largest kaolinite quarry in Central Europe with a production of 320,000 tons per year.

Sights
There are no significant monuments in the town. The Chapel of Saint John the Baptist dates from 1893.

References

External links

Cities and towns in the Czech Republic
Populated places in Plzeň-North District